We Are Not Ghouls is a 2022 documentary film about JAG attorney Lieutenant-Colonel Yvonne Bradley's work to free Guantanamo Bay detainee Binyam Mohamed. The film was directed by Chris James Thompson and is based on the book The Guantánamo Lawyers: Inside a Prison Outside the Law. The documentary premiered at the 2022 SXSW Film Festival, where it won the Audience Award in the Documentary Spotlight category. The film then played at the 2022 DOC NYC Film Festival before being released nationally in February 2023.

Synopsis
US Air Force JAG attorney Yvonne Bradley volunteered to defend a man named Binyam Mohamed who was facing a death penalty case at Guantanamo Bay in 2005. Believing the detainees at Guantanamo were “the worst of the worst” in the war on terror, Yvonne's world was turned upside down as she arrived in Cuba and began to untangle an unimaginable case. Spending the next four years battling to uncover the truth, Yvonne's is a captivating story of taking responsibility in the face of corruption at the highest levels of power, and the dangers of choosing to stand up for what you believe in.

Interviewees
Yvonne Bradley - US Air Force JAG
Clive Stafford Smith - Human Rights Attorney
Darrel Vandeveld - US Army Reserve JAG
Stephen Grey - Investigative Journalist 
Janet Hamlin - Illustrator

Release
The film was acquired for distribution by Gravitas Ventures and was released in February 2023 on Amazon Prime Video, iTunes, Google Play, and others.

References

External links
 
 https://www.wearenotghouls.com/ - Official Website

2022 films
2022 documentary films
American documentary films
Guantanamo Bay detention camp
2020s American films